The Malaysia women's national basketball team is a national basketball team of Malaysia. It is managed by the Malaysia Basketball Association (MABA). (Malay: Persatuan Bola Keranjang Malaysia).

In terms of qualifications to the FIBA Women's Basketball World Cup, Malaysia's ranks as one of Asia's top five basketball nations.

In the Southeast Asian region, the team has traditionally been a top competitor.

In August 2017,  Malaysia’s national team defended gold after beating Thailand 65-60 in the 2017 SEA Games women's basketball match at the MABA Stadium in Kuala Lumpur. Yoong Sze Yuin's squad, which won its five previous games, started the game a little slow and trailed 12-26 in the first quarter but later managed to reduce the points gap in the second quarter to 35-39. The line-up of national players led by Nur Izzati Yaakob finished the game 65-60 in the fourth quarter. This win was the basketball squad’s 14th gold medal during the SEA Games since it was first competed in 1977. Yoong Sze Yuin had won the Singapore SEA Games two years ago, too.

Competitions

FIBA Women's Basketball World Cup

FIBA Women's Asia Cup

SEABA Championship for Women

Olympic Games
yet to qualify

Asian Games

Southeast Asian Games

Other Tournaments

Team

Current roster
Malaysia roster at the 2019 Southeast Asian Games

See also 
 Malaysia women's national under-19 basketball team
 Malaysia women's national under-17 basketball team
  Malaysia men's national basketball team
 Malaysia national under-19 basketball team
 Malaysia national under-17 basketball team
 Malaysia Pro League

References

External links
 Archived records of Malaysia team participations

Malaysia
National team
Basketball teams in Malaysia
Basketball